The Luxembourger ambassador in Beijing is the official representative of the Government in Luxembourg City to the Government of the People's Republic of China concurrently accredited in Ulaanbaatar (Mongolia), Hanoi (Vietnam) and Singapore.

List of representatives

References 

 
China
Luxembourg